The Ulvich is a river in Perm Krai, Russia, a right tributary of the Yayva. It starts on the west slope of the Kvarkush mountain range. Its mouth is downstream of the village Sukhaya,  from the mouth of the Yayva River. There are some small tributaries.

Etymology 
The most believable version of the origin of the river's name is that it is a composition of the words ‘ul’ (‘wet’ in Mansi language) and ‘vich’ (‘branch’ from Russian ‘vichka’), so it can be translated as ‘wet branch’. Also, it is may be from the word ‘vidz’ (meadow), in which case Ulvich means ‘wet meadow’.

Sources 
 Пермская область. Коми-Пермяцкий автономный округ: общегеогр. регион. атлас: сост. по состоянию на 1985-1997 гг.: масштаб 1:200000 : планы городов: Перми (1:50000), Кудымкара (1:20000) / ЦЭВКФ; ред. Ю. Кузнецов, Д. Трушин. 1-е изд. М.: ВТУ ГШ, 2000. 128 с.
 Ресурсы поверхностных вод СССР. Гидрологическая изученность. Т. 2: Средний Урал и Приуралье. Вып. 1: Кама / под ред. В. В. Николаенко. Л.: Гидрометеоиздат, 1966. 324 с., С. 70

References

Rivers of Perm Krai